Kal Hamara Hai is a 1959 Bollywood social drama film directed by S. K. Prabhakar and starring Madhubala in dual role with Bharat Bhushan. The plot revolves around two lookalike sisters Madhu and Bela who fall for a single man named Bharat.

Plot 
Bharat, a young man, works as a puppet for greedy and wealthy Seth Hiralal. Hiralal once asks him to kill an old man who knows the truth of Hiralal's black marketing and show this as an accident, to which Bharat refuses. However, Hiralal himself knocks the old man down with his car and blames Bharat for this. Bharat is imprisoned but soon runs away from the jail with a thought of revenge. When he is about to murder Hiralal for destroying his life, Bharat meets a girl who is also hidden behind a pillar in order to steal something from Hiralal's house. She introduces herself as Madhu, and tells him that the purpose for stealing is she does not have money to buy medicines for her father, who met with a fatal accident just few days ago.

Bharat decides to help Madhu and buys her medicine for her father. To his shock, her father is no one other than the old man whom Hiralal had asked to kill. Madhu's father is somehow not able to recognise Bharat.

Madhu has a sister named Bela, who looks just like her and is sent to study in Delhi. One day, she sends a letter to Madhu telling her that she left the college as she was not able to pay the fees, and moreover, she is not interested in studies anymore. She began working as a dancer in a club to earn money. Hiralal notices Bela while she is dancing and tries to buy her. However, Bela is beauty-with-brains; she backs off Hiralal's plan, which infuriates him.

On the other hand, in spite of no relation, Bharat begins helping Madhu financially and they fall in love. Madhu asks him to bring Bela back home and he promises her the same.

Bharat goes to Delhi at once and tries to make Bela understand and succeeds. Bela, too like her sister, is impressed by his personality and falls for him. When Bela learns that Madhu also loves him, she leaves her sister's house; on her way is murdered by an infuriated Hiralal.

Bharat is framed by Hiralal for murdering Bela. During the courtroom drama when Bharat is tried, it is revealed that he is the son of none other than Hiralal; his jealous relative had kidnapped him when he was an infant.

As Bharat is imprisoned, Hiralal reveals to the court that Bela was killed by him. He also tells the court that throughout his life he earned money by wrong ways. He framed Bharat several times; he is regretting now.

In the end, Bharat reunites with his family, marries Madhu and Hiralal is jailed.

Cast 
 Madhubala as Madhu / Bela (double role)
 Bharat Bhushan as Bharat
 Jayant as Seth Hiralal
Leela Chitnis as Hiralal's wife
 Murad as Lawyer
 Bhram Bhardwaj as Bharat's friend
 Hari Shivdasani as Inspector Umesh Mehra
 Nazir Kashmiri as Doctor

Soundtrack
The soundtrack of Kal Hamara Hai was composed by Chitragupta and the lyrics were penned by Shailendra and Majrooh Sultanpuri.

Reception
According to a report by Filmindia, Kal Hamara Hai opened to thronged houses and attracted "appreciative crowds" since its theatrical release on April 24, 1959. However, the enthusiasm among audience faded away after a few weeks. Nevertheless, the soundtrack was very well-received.

Among the reviewers, Manjeet Singh of Thought disliked Kal Hamara Hai for its familiar tricks and story, but singled out Madhubala for her performance. Most of the reviews were mixed; Khatija Akbar said in 1997 that "Kal Hamara Hai remained lacklustre, in spite of Madhubala's heroic efforts to save the movie. Playing twins, she turned in a polished performance, particularly in the role of the misguided "other" sister." On the contrary, Amarnath's daughter wrote: "Though Kal Hamara Hai did not do very well at the box-office, it is on the top of my list as one of my most favourite movies produced by my father. In my opinion, it was made before its time. It is a very thought-provoking socially conscious movie."

Trivia
The scene where Bela (Madhubala) gives an autograph to a man was reused in 1962 film Half Ticket.
Actor Manoj Kumar was a frequent visitor of K. Amarnath on the sets of Kal Hamara Hai. Later Kumar had admitted that the hero of Upkar (1967) was inspired from the hero of Kal Hamara Hai.

References

Sources

External links

1959 films
1950s Hindi-language films